Carmelo Conte (born 1938) is an Italian lawyer and socialist politician who served as the minister for urban areas problems for three terms.

Biography
Conte was born in Piaggine, Salerno, on 9 November 1938. He has a bachelor's degree in law. He was a member of the Italian Socialist Party. He was first elected to the Italian Parliament in 1979 for the Italian Socialist Party from Benevento. He served in the Parliament for three more terms until 1994. Patrick McCarthy, an American scholar, argues that Conte created a nepotic network in his election region based in Salerno like other leading socialist politicians of the period.

Conte was appointed minister without portfolio for urban problems on 22 July 1989 to the sixth cabinet of Giulio Andreotti. He also held the post in the next cabinet of Giulio Andreotti and in the first cabinet of Giuliano Amato. Conte's term ended on 28 April 1993.

Conte has been the author of several books last of which was published in 2019.

References

External link

20th-century Italian lawyers
1938 births
Living people
Italian Socialist Party politicians
Government ministers of Italy
Deputies of Legislature VIII of Italy
Deputies of Legislature IX of Italy
Deputies of Legislature X of Italy
Deputies of Legislature XI of Italy
People from Salerno
20th-century Italian writers
21st-century Italian writers